Shadow of the Moon is the debut studio album by the group Blackmore's Night, released June 2, 1997. It stayed on the German charts for 17 weeks. It received a gold certification in Japan for 100,000 albums shipped to stores.

Track listing

Bonus track

Personnel
 Ritchie Blackmore – electric guitars, acoustic guitars, bass, mandolin, drum, tambourine
 Candice Night – lead vocals, backing vocals
 Pat Regan – keyboards
 Gerald Flashman – recorders, trumpet, French horns
 Tom Brown – cello
 Lady Green – viola, violins

 Guest appearances
 Ian Anderson – flute on "Play, Minstrel, Play"
 Scott Hazell – backing vocals on "Play, Minstrel, Play"

Charts

Notes

External links
 Lyrics at Blackmore's Night official site

Blackmore's Night albums
1997 debut albums